The Steinbach Pistons are a Junior "A" ice hockey team from Steinbach, Manitoba, Canada.  They are members of the Manitoba Junior Hockey League, which is a member of the Canadian Junior Hockey League.

History

Southeast Thunderbirds/T-Birds/Blades
The MJHL granted an expansion team to the Southeast Tribal Council, a group of First Nation bands in southeastern Manitoba, to begin play in the 1988–89 season.  The team was known as the Southeast Thunderbirds and played out of the Notre Dame Arena in Winnipeg.  The team was renamed the Southeast Blades in 1992.  After taking a leave of absence for the 1996–97 season, the Blades moved northeast of Winnipeg to Sagkeeng First Nation.  The Blades played ten seasons in Sagkeeng, the most successful being the 2002–03 season when they advanced to the Turnbull Cup finals which they lost to the OCN Blizzard.

Beausejour Blades
The Beausejour Blades were formed in 2007 following the sale and relocation of the team to the Sun Gro Centre in Beausejour.  The move did not improve the team's fortunes; the Blades managed to win only 13 games over the two seasons of their existence.

Steinbach Pistons
During the 2009 Allan Cup in Steinbach, Manitoba, the City of Steinbach, together with Blades management, announced that the team would be relocating to Steinbach for the 2009–10 MJHL season.  The team was renamed the Steinbach Pistons, in recognition of the city's reputation as "The Automobile City". Steinbach was previously home to a MJHL team called the Hawks from 1985 to 1988.

Despite the team's improved record after the move to Steinbach, the Pistons failed to qualify for the playoffs in each of their first three seasons. The team's continued poor performance and strained financial position spurred a group of investors from the local business community to purchase the Pistons in 2012 and convert it to a community-owned organization.  The next season, the Pistons ended the franchise's ten year playoff drought and captured their first Turnbull Cup.

The Pistons enjoyed their best season in 2017-2018 when the team won its second Turnbull Cup, defeated the Nipawin Hawks to win the ANAVET Cup, and qualified for the 2018 Royal Bank Cup.

Season-by-season record
Note: GP = Games Played, W = Wins, L = Losses, T = Ties, OTL = Overtime Losses, GF = Goals for, GA = Goals against

Playoffs
1989 DNQ
1990 Lost Div Semi Final
Kildonan North Stars defeated Southeast Thunderbirds 4-games-to-none
1991 DNQ
1992 DNQ
1993 DNQ
1994 Lost Div Semi Final
St. Boniface Saints defeated Southeast Blades 4-games-to-1
1995 Lost Div Semi Final
St. Boniface Saints defeated Southeast Blades 4-games-to-none
1996 DNQ
1997 Did Not Participate
1998 DNQ
1999 DNQ
2000 DNQ
2001 DNQ
2002 DNQ
2003 Lost Final
Southeast Blades defeated Winkler Flyers 4-games-to-3
Southeast Blades defeated Winnipeg South Blues 4-games-to-1
OCN Blizzard defeated Southeast Blades 4-games-to-none
2004 DNQ
2005 DNQ
2006 DNQ
2007 DNQ
2008 DNQ
2009 DNQ
2010 DNQ
2011 DNQ
2012 DNQ
2013 Won League, Lost in 2013 Western Canada Cup round robin
Steinbach Pistons defeated Portage Terriers 4-games-to-3
Steinbach Pistons defeated Winnipeg Blues 4-games-to-2
Steinbach Pistons defeated Dauphin Kings 4-games-to-2 MJHL CHAMPIONS
Fifth and eliminated from 2013 Western Canada Cup round robin (0-4)
2014 Lost Division Final
Steinbach Pistons defeated Portage Terriers 4-games-to-3
Winnipeg Blues defeated Steinbach Pistons 4-games-to-1
2015 Lost Final
Steinbach Pistons defeated Selkirk Steelers 4-games-to-0
Steinbach Pistons defeated Winnipeg Blues 4-games-to-1
Portage Terriers defeated Steinbach Pistons 4-games-to-0
2016 Lost Final
Steinbach Pistons defeated Swan Valley Stampeders 4-games-to-0
Steinbach Pistons defeated Winkler Flyers 4-games-to-3
Portage Terriers defeated Steinbach Pistons 4-games-to-1
2017 Lost Semi-final
Steinbach Pistons defeated Neepawa Natives 4-games-to-2
Portage Terriers defeated Steinbach Pistons 4-games-to-2
2018 Won League, Won ANAVET Cup
Steinbach Pistons defeated Swan Valley Stampeders 4-games-to-0
Steinbach Pistons defeated Winnipeg Blues 4-games-to-2
Steinbach Pistons defeated Virden Oil Capitals 4-games-to-2 MJHL CHAMPIONS
Steinbach Pistons defeated Nipawin Hawks 4-games-to-2 ANAVET CUP CHAMPIONS
Fifth and eliminated from 2018 Royal Bank Cup round robin (0-2-2)
2019 Lost Semi-final
Steinbach Pistons defeated Winnipeg Blues 4-games-to-2
Swan Valley Stampeders defeated Steinbach Pistons 4-games-to-2
2020 Won Quarter-final
Steinbach Pistons defeated Winnipeg Blues 4-games-to-0
Remainder of season cancelled due to COVID-19 pandemic
2021 Playoffs cancelled
2022
Steinbach Pistons defeated Selkirk Steelers 4-games-to-1
Steinbach Pistons defeated Virden Oil Capitals 4-games-to-2
Dauphin Kings defeated Steinbach Pistons 4-games-to-3

Head coaches
The following is a list of the franchise's head coaches:

Gallery

See also
List of ice hockey teams in Manitoba

References

External links
Steinbach Pistons website
Steinbach Pistons season statistics and records at The Internet Hockey Database
Steinbach Pistons win over OCN

Sport in Steinbach, Manitoba
Manitoba Junior Hockey League teams